The 1927 Stanley Cup Finals was played by the Ottawa Senators and the Boston Bruins. It was the first time the Cup was solely contested by National Hockey League teams, owing to the demise of the Western Hockey League the previous year. It was won by the Ottawa Senators, coached by Dave Gill, over the Boston Bruins, coached by Art Ross. This was the Senators' fourth win since 1920, and eleventh overall, but it marked the end of the dynasty. The original Senators would not win another.

It would be the last time a team from Ottawa would play in the Finals until the 2007 Stanley Cup Finals, and the first Stanley Cup Finals to have games played in both Canada and the United States.

Game summaries
The Stanley Cup Finals was originally intended to be a best-of-three series. After the first game was declared a draw, NHL president Frank Calder ruled that the series would go no more than five games, with overtimes limited to 20 minutes. If the teams were tied after five games, the teams would share the championship. In the end, the series went four games because of two ties. These were the last ties in Stanley Cup history, notwithstanding the unfinished 3–3 Stanley Cup final match between Edmonton and Boston on May 24, 1988. Ottawa's Frank Nighbor was playing in his sixth Stanley Cup series, while Boston's Sprague Cleghorn and Billy Coutu were playing in their fifth Stanley Cup series.

Rough play marred the series: in the final game, Lionel Hitchman and George Boucher were ejected for a wild fight which Ottawa police had to break up. Hooley Smith butt-ended Boston's Harry Oliver, and Eddie Shore fought with Smith in retaliation; both Smith and Shore were ejected. After the game, Billy Coutu assaulted referee Jerry Laflamme, tackled referee Billy Bell and started a bench-clearing brawl. Coutu was barred from the league for life, Smith was given a one-month suspension effective in the 1927–28 season, while Boucher, Hitchman and Jimmy Herbert were all fined.

The April 13, 1927, game at the Ottawa Auditorium was the last Stanley Cup Finals game in Ottawa until the June 2, 2007, game played at Scotiabank Place between the current Senators and the Anaheim Ducks. It is known that one fan, Russell Williams, attended both games, 80 years apart, both games won by Ottawa.

Game one

The first game ended in a scoreless draw after two ten-minute overtime periods. In the overtime, the condition of the ice became unplayable and NHL President Frank Calder called the game. There were two disallowed goals, one by each team, and both disallowed by off-sides.

Before the next game, Calder decided that the series would play to five games if necessary. If after the five games, the teams were tied, that the teams would share the Stanley Cup honours. Calder also ruled that overtimes would be limited to 20 minutes.

Game two

In the second game, the Senators changed their tactics, going on the offensive. King Clancy and Cy Denneny scored in the first period for Ottawa. The Senators played a defensive game in the second period. In the third period, Harry Oliver scored for the Bruins on a goal-mouth scramble to bring the Bruins within one. In the final minute, with the Bruins pressing, Denneny scored again to put the game beyond doubt.

Game three

The series switched to Ottawa. The Bruins took the early lead. Jimmy "Sailor" Herbert broke in on a pass from Harry Oliver and beat Alex Connell in the Ottawa net at 7:14 of the first period. In the second, the Senators picked up the pace and Denneny scored at 15:15 on a pass from Clancy to tie the score. Neither team could break the tie in the third period or the two overtimes. The result meant that Ottawa could win the series with a win in game four, making game five unnecessary.

Game four

The Senators decided to start two players who had been substitutes in the previous games, Frank Finnigan and Hec Kilrea and the moves were a success. The Senators came out on the offensive and took a 2–0 lead in the first period on goals by Finnigan and Denneny. Denneny scored again in the third period to put the Senators ahead 3–0. The game degenerated after that.  Lionel Hitchman and George Boucher fought, with Eddie Shore jumping in. Ottawa police jumped onto the ice to help the referees and Hitchman and Boucher were ejected. Oliver scored with six minutes to play. Ottawa's Hooley Smith butt-ended Oliver in the face with a minute to play. Shore jumped in to fight Smith and the two were ejected. After the game Coutu attacked referee Laflamme on his way to the dressing room.

Stanley Cup engraving
The 1927 Stanley Cup was presented to Senators captain George Boucher by NHL President Frank Calder following the Senators 3–1 win over the Bruins in game four.

The following Senators players and staff had their names engraved on the Stanley Cup

With the win Hooley Smith became the fourth player to have won Olympic gold and the Stanley Cup. Smith had won the gold medal at the 1924 Olympics with the Toronto Granites.

1926–27 Ottawa Senators

See also
1926–27 NHL season

References

 
Notes

Stanley Cup
Stanley Cup Finals
Boston Bruins games
Ottawa Senators (original) games
 
Stanley Cup Finals
Ice hockey competitions in Ottawa
Ice hockey competitions in Boston
Stanley Cup Finals
Stanley Cup Finals
1920s in Boston
1920s in Ottawa